The Schreder HP-12 was an American FAI Standard Class  glider  designed by Richard Schreder for the 1965 World Gliding Championships.

The HP-12 is often confused with a completely different aircraft, the Schreder HP-12A.

Design and development
The HP-12 (HP stands for high performance) was an all-metal sailplane that Schreder developed to take to the United Kingdom for the 1965 World Championships held in South Cerney, England.

Operational history
The sole HP-12 built was being flown by John Karlovich when it suffered a structural failure over Marfa, Texas while flying in the 1972 US Nationals. Karlovich successfully bailed out of the aircraft, but the HP-12 was destroyed.

Specifications (HP-12)

See also

References

1960s United States sailplanes
Schreder aircraft
Aircraft first flown in 1965